At least two ships of the French Navy have been named Hova:

 , an  launched in 1917 and struck in 1936.
 , a  launched as USS Hova and transferred to France in 1944. She was returned to the US Navy in 1964.

French Navy ship names